The Compton Family Ice Arena is a 5,022-seat, two-rink ice facility in Notre Dame, Indiana on the campus of the University of Notre Dame. The arena saw its first game on October 21, 2011. The ice arena replaced the 2,857-seat rink in the north dome of the Edmund P. Joyce Center. 

It is named in honor of former San Jose Sharks part-owners Kevin and Gayla Compton, whose gift led funding for the project.

The new ice arena is located south of the Joyce Center, just north of Edison Road, and just west of where the new Irish track and field facility is being constructed. The majority of the general public arena seating is of the chair-back variety. The facility includes two sheets of ice (one of them Olympic-sized), with limited seating availability for the second sheet. Offices, locker room, and training facilities for the Notre Dame hockey program will be located within the facility. The weight room within the building will be available for use by all Fighting Irish varsity athletes. Eight auxiliary locker rooms will be available for campus and community use of the facility.

History 
On February 12, 2009, the University of Notre Dame announced it would begin construction the next year on a new, freestanding, on-campus ice arena designed to meet the needs of both the nationally ranked Irish men's hockey team and the local community. Construction began on March 15, 2010 on the 5,022-seat arena, which opened on schedule on October 18, 2011.

The University originally had planned to renovate the current Joyce Center ice facility, but additional studies changed that plan to instead feature a new building. With the completion of the new arena, the ice plant was removed from the Joyce Center's north dome, making its space available for a variety of other events.

Charles W. "Lefty" Smith Jr. Rink 
The main ice arena features a 200' x 90' ice rink.  The facility is named the Charles W. "Lefty" Smith Jr. Rink, in honor of the first coach in the program's history.

References

External links 
 Compton Family Ice Arena
 Notre Dame Fighting Irish men's ice hockey

College ice hockey venues in the United States
Notre Dame Fighting Irish ice hockey
University of Notre Dame buildings and structures
Sports venues in South Bend, Indiana
Ice hockey venues in Indiana
University and college buildings completed in 2011